The 1970 United States Grand Prix was a Formula One motor race held on October 4, 1970 at the Watkins Glen Grand Prix Race Course in Watkins Glen, New York. It was race 12 of 13 in both the 1970 World Championship of Drivers and the 1970 International Cup for Formula One Manufacturers.

The 108-lap race was won by Emerson Fittipaldi, driving a Lotus-Ford, after he started from third position. Fittipaldi achieved his first Formula One victory, and the first for a Brazilian driver, in only his fourth Grand Prix start. Mexican driver Pedro Rodríguez finished second in a BRM, having led before a late pit stop for fuel, while Fittipaldi's Swedish team-mate Reine Wisell, making his F1 debut, finished third, which would turn out to be his only podium finish.

Belgian driver Jacky Ickx finished fourth in his Ferrari, having started from pole position before pitting to repair a broken fuel line. This result meant that Jochen Rindt became the first and, to date, only posthumous Formula One World Champion.

This would be the final Grand Prix for the circuit in this original fast configuration. 1971 would see a new longer layout presenting more of a challenge.

Report
The Ferrari of Jacky Ickx was fastest in the initial practice session on Friday with a time of 1:03.07, but expectations were high for the Tyrrell 001 of Jackie Stewart, which had led the first 31 laps in its first outing in the previous race in Canada until axle failure ended its charge. The final session on Saturday was marred by a downpour that left only fifteen minutes of dry track time, and it was not enough for Stewart to knock Ickx off the pole. Emerson Fittipaldi, who spent the first half of the season in European Formula Two, was just five hundredths behind Stewart in third.

On Sunday, with a crowd exceeding 100,000 for the second straight year, black clouds and a shower 20 minutes prior to the race caused a lot of excitement among the crews on the grid, as many teams changed to rain tires and back again. By the start, however, all but Clay Regazzoni and Derek Bell had reverted to slicks. Stewart took the lead off the grid, ahead of Pedro Rodríguez, as Fittipaldi dropped to eighth behind Ickx, Regazzoni, Chris Amon, John Surtees and Jackie Oliver.

By lap 17, the Ferraris of Ickx and Regazzoni had passed Rodríguez, but by that time, Stewart's lead was nearly twenty seconds. Graham Hill, in a privately entered Lotus 72, came into the pits on lap 30 with fuel leaking into the cockpit, as a fitting had come loose under the seat. The team took 10 minutes to fix the leak, threw some water on Hill, whose overalls were soaked in fuel, and sent him back out. Several laps later, Hill returned to request they find him some dry overalls, as the gasoline was burning his skin. When he stopped again to change clothes, the team said they had not been able to locate any new ones. Hill, however, saw John Surtees, who had retired on the seventh lap, sitting on the wall, and borrowed his overalls and undergarments. The two former World Champions were naked in the pits as Hill was doused with water before donning Surtees' clean clothes and returning to the track, only to retire on lap 72 with a broken clutch.

At half-distance, Stewart was nearly half a lap ahead of Ickx, with Rodríguez in third and Fittipaldi about to be lapped in fourth. Ickx suddenly pitted on lap 57 to repair a broken fuel line, and he rejoined in twelfth place. He fought his way back up to fourth, setting the race's fastest lap three laps from the finish. Ickx had needed to win to have a chance of overtaking Jochen Rindt in the Championship; his fourth-place finish meant that Rindt became the first posthumous Formula One World Champion.

On lap 76, with a one-minute cushion, Stewart's Tyrrell began trailing smoke from its left-hand exhaust pipe. The smoke slowly grew worse, and Rodríguez tore into Stewart's lead, taking off five seconds a lap, while the Lotus teammates unlapped themselves. On lap 83, with its oil gone, the Cosworth engine in the Tyrrell seized, leaving Rodríguez with an 18.8 second lead over Fittipaldi, who led team-mate Reine Wisell by another 46 seconds.

At the end of the 100th lap, Rodríguez coasted into the pit lane having run out of fuel. BRM refueled the car, but Rodríguez had lost 38 seconds to Fittipaldi, who took the lead. Rodríguez rejoined ahead of the second Lotus of Wisell.

Fittipaldi recalled later, "I took the lead and, going over the finish line, I saw for the first time Colin [Chapman] jumping and throwing his hat, something I'd seen him do for Jim Clark and Graham Hill and Jochen, and I kept saying to myself, 'He's doing that for me. I won the race. I won the US Grand Prix!' It was unbelievable."

His victory was the seventh American win for Lotus, and it clinched the Drivers' Championship for the team's dead leader, Jochen Rindt, and the Constructors' Championship for Lotus and Colin Chapman.

This was the final Grand Prix to be held on the  layout of the track, in use since 1956.

Qualifying

Qualifying classification

Race

Classification

Championship standings after the race

Drivers' Championship standings

Constructors' Championship standings

References

Further reading
 Doug Nye (1978). The United States Grand Prix and Grand Prize Races, 1908-1977. B. T. Batsford. 
 Rob Walker (January, 1971). "U.S. Grand Prix". Road & Track, 84-88.
 Gordon Kirby (October, 1995). "Emerson Who?". RACER, 70-72.

United States Grand Prix
United States Grand Prix
United States Grand Prix
United States Grand Prix
United States Grand Prix